CLIPZ is a database of post-transcriptional regulatory elements (RNA-binding proteins) built from cross-linking and immunoprecipitation data.

Notes and references

See also 
 RNA-binding protein
 List of biological databases

External links 
 http://www.clipz.unibas.ch

Gene expression
RNA
Biological databases